TV3 MAX is a Danish TV channel dedicated to male viewers. The channel launched on 31 October 2017 and replaced TV3 Sport 2. The channel is owned by Viaplay Group.

Programming
TV3 MAX broadcasts sports like the Danish Superliga, Premier League, La Liga, UEFA Champions League, ATP tennis and motorsport as well as series like Top Gear, The Simpsons and How I Met Your Mother.

References

External links
 

Television stations in Denmark
Television channels and stations established in 2017
2017 establishments in Denmark
Sports television in Denmark
Modern Times Group